John Abineri (18 May 1928 – 29 June 2000) was an English actor.

Born in London, he attended the Old Vic drama school and described himself as "Well educated from the age of five to eighteen". He spoke a number of languages (including German, Russian and French) fluently, which led to him being cast as a number of different nationalities.

His extensive television performances included numerous roles in cult TV drama series, for which he is now probably best remembered. He had regular roles in Survivors as Hubert Goss, and in HTV's Robin of Sherwood as Herne the Hunter. He appeared on four occasions in Doctor Who and also in the Blake's 7 episode "Hostage", taking over the role of Ushton after the sudden death of the actor Duncan Lamont, with whom he had co-starred in the Doctor Who serial Death to the Daleks. He also appeared as Sir George Mortenhurze in the BBC's The Moon Stallion, as Arnold Rimmer's father in Red Dwarf, and as Father Gruber in the 1989 TV adaptation of Around the World in 80 Days.

He received an Emmy nomination for his performance as Chingachgook in the TV adaptation of Last Of The Mohicans (1971) and Hawkeye, The Pathfinder (1973). He also played the butler in the original Ferrero Rocher Ambassador's reception advert.

His film credits include roles in Funeral in Berlin (1966), The McKenzie Break (1970), Pope Joan (1972), The Godfather Part III (1990) and Giorgino (1994).

He was the father of actors Sebastian Abineri, Daniel Abineri and Jaz Abineri.

Selected film and TV roles

The White Trap (1959) - Bernie - Photographer (uncredited)
The Rebel (1960) - Artist at Party (uncredited)
House of Mystery (1961) - Milkman
Echo of Barbara (1961) - Rankin
The Password Is Courage (1962) - German Officer (uncredited)
Operation Crossbow (1965) - German Policeman (uncredited)
Dead Man's Chest : (Edgar Wallace Mysteries)  (1965) - Arthur
Funeral in Berlin (1966) - Rukel
The Baron (1966) - Cerdan
The Magnificent Two (1967) - Official (uncredited)
Doctor Who: Fury from the Deep (1968) - Van Lutyens
Attack on the Iron Coast (1968) - German Gunnery Sergeant (uncredited)
The Assassination Bureau (1969) - Police Inspector (uncredited)
Pegasus (1969, TV series) -  Louis Rene Lavassoir Latouche
Special Branch (1969, TV series) - Comber
Doctor Who: The Ambassadors of Death (1970, TV Series) - General Carrington
The McKenzie Break (1970) - Capt. Kranz
Diamonds Are Forever (1971) - Airline Representative (uncredited)
Pope Joan (1972) - Church official
Doctor Who: Death to the Daleks (1974, TV Series) - Richard Railton
Soft Beds, Hard Battles (1974) - Prefect of Police (uncredited)
Operation: Daybreak (1975) - (uncredited)
Survivors (1976-1977, TV Series) - Hubert Goss 
Doctor Who: The Power of Kroll (1978-1979, TV Series) - Ranquin
 A Tale of Two Cities (1980, TV series) - Roadmender
Robin of Sherwood (1984-1986, TV Series) - Herne the Hunter
 Honour, Profit and Pleasure (1985, TV film) - George I
The Godfather Part III (1990) - Hamilton Banker
Giorgino (1994) - Dr. Jodel
The Window Bed (1999) - Jack (final film role)

References

External links

1928 births
2000 deaths
English male television actors
Male actors from London
20th-century English male actors
Alumni of Bristol Old Vic Theatre School
English male film actors